Miriam Makeba is the self-titled debut album by Miriam Makeba. It was released in 1960 by RCA Victor.

Track listing

Personnel
 Miriam Makeba – vocals
 Perry Lopez - guitar
 The Belafonte Folk Singers conducted by Milt Okun

Notes

1960 debut albums
Miriam Makeba albums
RCA Victor albums
Gallo Record Company albums
Albums conducted by Milt Okun